SMBC Aviation Capital, formerly RBS Aviation Capital, is one of the world's largest aircraft leasing companies. It is owned by a consortium of leading Japanese institutions: Sumitomo Mitsui Banking Corporation (SMBC), Sumitomo Mitsui Finance and Leasing Company Limited (SMFL) and Sumitomo Corporation. Headquartered in the International Financial Services Centre in Dublin and with locations in Amsterdam, Beijing, Hong Kong, Kyiv, Moscow, New York, Seattle, Miami, Shanghai, Singapore, Tokyo and Toulouse, the company employs 160 people.

The company currently has a portfolio of 453 aircraft (273 owned and 180 managed) with a further 203 aircraft on order from Airbus and Boeing, made up of a mix of A320neos, A320-200s, B737-800s and B737 MAXs. It has more than 150 airline customers in over 50 countries worldwide, including a range of traditional carriers alongside start-up airlines.

Its strategy is to own and lease technologically-advanced, efficient and frequently-used aircraft types. SMBC Aviation Capital maintains a young fleet with an average weighted age of 4.7 years. The company has a BBB+ rating from Fitch.

In July 2016, the company completed a debut $500 million unsecured notes offering, which was eight times over-subscribed.

History
The company was founded in 1994 as International Aviation Management Group by Domhnal Slattery. In 2001, Royal Bank of Scotland Group acquired the company and rebranded it as Lombard Aviation Capital. The company was rebranded again in 2004 as RBS Aviation Capital.

By 2005, the company had taken delivery of its 200th aircraft and opened locations in Toulouse and Seattle, with expansion into South East Asia in 2007. 2009 saw the completion of its first export financing deal and also the location of a representative in Beijing.

In 2012, the company was acquired by the Japanese consortium for $7.3 billion, which was the largest ever global sale of an aircraft leasing business. The sale completed on 1 June 2012 and the business was renamed SMBC Aviation Capital.

In 2014, the company placed orders for new aircraft with Boeing and Airbus, representing future commitments of close to $20 billion, comprising 110 A320neo aircraft and five A321ceo aircraft from Airbus, for delivery between 2017 and 2022, and 80 B737 MAX 8 aircraft from Boeing, for delivery between 2018 and 2022. The B737 MAX deal was valued at more than $8.5 billion at list prices (although buyers typically get significant discounts).

The company received its first credit ratings of BBB+ from S&P and BBB from Fitch in 2014. Fitch ratings upgraded the company from BBB to BBB+ in 2015, making it one of the highest rated lessors in the industry. In 2015, the company set up a €600 million revolving credit facility.

The current CEO, Peter Barrett, assumed his position in 2004. He is a former employee of Guinness Peat Aviation (GPA), where he specialised in aircraft cross-border tax leasing and securitisations.

Education
SMBC Aviation Capital is one of the supporters of Europe's first masters in Aviation Finance in the Michael Smurfit Graduate School of Business in UCD. The company is the only lessor in the industry with a graduate recruitment programme.

References

External links

masters in Aviation Finance
Sumitomo Mitsui Banking Corporation (SMBC), 
Sumitomo Mitsui Finance and Leasing Company Limited
Sumitomo Corporation

Aircraft leasing companies
Companies based in Dublin (city)
Companies of the Republic of Ireland
Sumitomo Mitsui Financial Group